Arrival is the fourth studio album by the Swedish pop group ABBA. It was originally released in Sweden on 11 October 1976 by Polar Records. It became one of ABBA's most successful albums to date, producing three of their biggest hits: "Dancing Queen", "Money, Money, Money" and "Knowing Me, Knowing You". The track "Fernando", which had been recently released as a single in March 1976, was included on the Australian and New Zealand versions of the album. Arrival was the best-selling album of 1977 in the United Kingdom and was certified gold by the Recording Industry Association of America.

The album was first released on compact disc (CD) in 1984 and then re-issued in digitally remastered form a total of four times; first in 1997, then in 2001, 2005 as part of The Complete Studio Recordings box set, and again in 2006 (as a special Deluxe Edition).

On 7 October 2016, the album was released as a double vinyl mastered at Abbey Road Studios using Half Speed Mastering.

Background and production 
By the time ABBA began working on their fourth album in August 1975, they had achieved a modest level of success around the world. It was with Arrival however, that they would achieve global superstardom. Recording sessions began in August 1975 and continued until September 1976 at Metronome and Glen studios in Stockholm, Sweden. 

The first song to enter the studio was a track called "Boogaloo" on 4 August. Taking inspiration from the current disco sound (and in particular George McCrae's "Rock Your Baby"), the backing track was laid down. The group knew that they had something big on their hands, as member Agnetha Fältskog remarked: "We knew immediately it was going to be massive." With re-written lyrics, the song became known as "Dancing Queen", and would go on to be ABBA's biggest ever hit. Work on the song continued intermittently until December 1975 as the group's activities were increasing in the latter half of the year as they saw a sudden surge in popularity in the United Kingdom and Australia. During this time they also recorded a song (in Swedish) for member Anni-Frid Lyngstad's solo album, "Fernando". 

In March 1976, with "Fernando" re-written with English lyrics, it was released as an ABBA single, becoming the group's biggest hit to date - hitting No.1 in many countries, including a 14-week stay at No.1 in Australia. It was featured as the brand new track on their Greatest Hits album which was selling in huge numbers around that time, becoming the biggest-selling album of the year in the UK (in Australia, it was featured on the "Arrival" album placed between "Why Did It Have to Be Me" and "Tiger"). In the midst of this success, the group finally found time to return to the studio in late March. The next song they began working on was "Knowing Me, Knowing You", which was to become yet another major hit worldwide. Member Benny Andersson has said that it is "one of our five best recordings".

By the end of April two other songs had been laid down: "That's Me" and "Why Did It Have to Be Me". The latter was reworked into "Happy Hawaii" before ultimately arriving back at its original title with completely different lyrics and member Björn Ulvaeus on lead vocals as opposed to Faltskog and Lyngstad ("Happy Hawaii" would later be released as a B-side). A similar situation occurred with the next recording when a song entitled "Money, Money, Money" became "Gypsy Girl" and then back to its original title. "Money, Money, Money" would also be released as a single and become a major hit some months after the album's eventual release.

In June 1976, a TV special dedicated to the group (entitled ABBA-dabba-dooo!!) was filmed. Around the same time they recorded a song called "When I Kissed the Teacher," which would become the opening track on their new album. Late July saw the next two tracks, "Tiger" and "Dum Dum Diddle" recorded. Considered by biographer Carl Magnus Palm as the "complete antithesis" of each other, the former being a hard rocker against the pure pop of the latter, both Lyngstad and Ulvaeus have expressed dissatisfaction with "Dum Dum Diddle", with Ulvaeus admitting that it was a nonsense lyric he had come up with in desperation. The next song to be recorded was "My Love My Life". Originally titled "Monsieur Monsieur" and more upbeat, the song soon became a lush ballad with backing harmonies inspired by 10cc's hit "I'm Not in Love".

The final track to be recorded was an instrumental piece entitled "Ode to Dalecarlia". Featuring Andersson prominently on keyboards, the track was renamed "Arrival" – a word that had already been decided as the title of their new album. By September 1976 work on the album was finished just as "Dancing Queen" was topping the charts all over the world. The album cover shots were taken of the group posing in and out of a Bell 47 helicopter at the Barkarby Airport, northwest of Stockholm. The now-renowned "mirrored-B" copyrighted ABBA logo, an ambigram designed by Rune Söderqvist in 1976, was also premiered on the album cover. Arrival was released on 11 October 1976.

Critical reception 

In a contemporary review for Rolling Stone, music critic Ken Tucker panned Arrival as "Muzak mesmerizing in its modality" and wrote, "By reducing their already vapid lyrics to utter irrelevance, lead singers Anni-Frid Lyngstad and Agnetha Fältskog are liberated to natter on in their shrill voices without regard to emotion or expression." Robert Christgau of The Village Voice gave the album a "C", indicating "a record of clear professionalism or barely discernible inspiration, but not both."

In a review upon the album's 2001 reissue by Universal Records, AllMusic editor Bruce Eder found the material "brilliant" and complimented the reissue's "upgraded sound," as well as "those dramatic musical effects that this group played for maximum effect, which gave their music a raw power that their detractors usually overlooked; in the new edition, it's impossible to ignore." In The New Rolling Stone Album Guide (2004), music journalist Arion Berger recommended its Universal reissue to consumers.

The album became a major seller all over the world, becoming the top-selling album of 1977 in both the UK and West Germany for example. It had three of ABBA's biggest hits; "Dancing Queen," "Money Money Money" and "Knowing Me Knowing You," and in some territories a fourth with the inclusion of "Fernando" (which in most markets had featured on their earlier Greatest Hits album). "That's Me" was released as a single in Japan only.

The album was included in Robert Dimery's 1001 Albums You Must Hear Before You Die. Arrival re-entered the UK album charts at #94 for the week of August 3, 2018, for the first time since 1979.

Track listing
All tracks written by Benny Andersson and Björn Ulvaeus except where noted.

Notes:
"Fernando" was released in the original track listing for the Australian and New Zealand version of the original record after "Why Did It Have to Be Me?" and before "Tiger." This added more than 4 minutes of playtime to Side 2.

Personnel
 Agnetha Fältskog – vocals
 Anni-Frid Lyngstad – vocals
 Björn Ulvaeus – acoustic guitar, electric guitar, vocals
 Benny Andersson – piano, synthesizer, accordion, chimes, marimba, backing vocals

Additional musicians (original album)
 Ola Brunkert – drums
 Roger Palm – drums, tambourine and hi-hat percussion on "Dancing Queen"
 Malando Gassama – percussion
 Rutger Gunnarsson – bass, string arrangements on "My Love, My Life"
 Janne Schaffer – electric guitar on "My Love, My Life", "Knowing Me, Knowing You" (rhythm), "That's Me" and "Why Did It Have To Be Me?"
 Lasse Wellander – acoustic guitar on "Dum Dum Diddle", electric lead guitar on "Knowing Me, Knowing You" and "Tiger"
 Anders Glenmark – electric guitar on "Money, Money, Money"
 Lars Carlsson – saxophone on "Why Did It Have To Be Me?"
 Sven-Olof Walldoff – string arrangements on "Dancing Queen"
 Anders Dahl - string arrangements on "Arrival"

Production
 Benny Andersson – producer, arranger
 Björn Ulvaeus – producer, arranger
 Michael B. Tretow – engineer
 Ola Lager – cover design, photography
Rune Söderqvist – cover design
 Jon Astley – remastering (1997 re-issue and 2001 re-issue)
Tim Young – remastering (1997 re-issue)
Michael B. Tretow – remastering (1997 re-issue and 2001 re-issue)
 Henrik Jonsson – remastering (The Complete Studio Recordings box set)

Chart positions

Weekly charts

Year-end charts

Decade-end charts

Certifications and sales

See also
 List of best-selling albums in Australia

References

External links
 https://www.webcitation.org/66jBp3Gjd?url=http://www.abba4therecord.com/ ABBA discography (Arrival releases worldwide)
 

1976 albums
ABBA albums
Albums produced by Björn Ulvaeus
Albums produced by Benny Andersson
Atlantic Records albums
Epic Records albums
Polar Music albums